Paolo Vella CMG was a judge of the Court of Appeal of Malta. He was made a Companion of the Order of St Michael and St George in the 1890 Birthday Honours.

References 

Companions of the Order of St Michael and St George
Year of birth missing
Year of death missing
Place of birth missing
Place of death missing
19th-century Maltese judges